Yport is a commune in the Seine-Maritime department in the Normandy region in  northern France. The residents are known as Yportais or Yportaises.

Location

Population

History
The site was probably occupied during the neolithic period, and later the Pays de Caux was inhabited by the Calates. During the Roman time, a road connecting Fécamp to Étretat passed through the locality at Pitron Fund from where a junction towards the village existed. The current D940 follows the route of this Roman road. The Roman presence was discovered following various archaeological excavations but nothing proves that it was permanently inhabited. It may have been only a fishing site. Starting from the early Middle Ages the village was attached to Criquebeuf-en-Caux, where the church, the cemetery and the school were located, several kilometres away from Yport. Only in the 19th century did the commune of Yport come into existence, primarily because of the construction of the church. Officially, the commune of Yport was created on January 1, 1843 and its first mayor was Jean-Baptiste Feuilloley. The 19th century marked the beginning of the rise of sea-fishing. Many people were attracted to the area by the work and the population reached 1800. The sea front evolved considerably during this period. As a working port, the sea front had fishing-smacks, skiffs, caïques and other vessels moored up to the bollards.

During the 19th century, sea-bathing came into fashion, and Yport did not escape from it. In 1849 and 1884, the village was hit by cholera epidemics.
Later, in the 1960s, fishing disappeared, like everywhere on the Côte d'Albâtre. The pace of life in the fishing village changed only very little. Yport is nowadays primarily a tourist town, with the casino, the beach and many quality restaurants. A large car-park has now replaced most of the fishing boats at the sea-front.

Heraldry

Tourism
 Cliffs
 Pebble beach
 St. Martin's church: building started in 1838, it was finished only in 1876 after many modifications.
 Casino
 Yport is the place where Guy de Maupassant set his novel Une Vie

Festivals
Torch-light parade on July 13.
Festival of the sea and painting on August 15 (mass, blessing, holy procession). An exhibition of paintings, painters and sculptors in the streets and on the beach, auction sale at 5pm of the art created during the course of the day.

See also
 Communes of the Seine-Maritime department

References

External links

 Tourisme à Yport 
 Statistical data, INSEE

Communes of Seine-Maritime
Seaside resorts in France